The 1984 King Cup was the 26th season of the knockout competition since its establishment in 1956. Al-Ahli were the defending champions but they finished as runners-up. 

Al-Hilal won the competition for the fifth time, beating the defending champions Al-Ahli 4–0 in the final at the Youth Welfare Stadium in Riyadh.

Bracket

Source: Al-Jazirah

Round of 32
The matches of the Round of 32 were played on 21, 22, 23 and 25 March 1984.

Round of 16
The Round of 16 matches were held on 29 and 30 March 1984.

Quarter-finals
The Quarter-final matches were held on 5 and 6 April 1984.

Semi-finals
The four winners of the quarter-finals progressed to the semi-finals. The semi-finals were played on 12 and 13 April 1984. All times are local, AST (UTC+3).

Final
The final was played between Al-Hilal and Al-Ahli in the Youth Welfare Stadium in Riyadh. Al-Ahli were appearing in their 13th final while Al-Hilal reached the final for the 9th time.

Top goalscorers

References

1984
Saudi Arabia
Cup